The 2007 USA Cycling National Racing Calendar is a series of men's and women's road bicycle racing events held between March 3 and September 16.  The USA Cycling NRC consists of numerous one-day races, including criteriums, and multi-day stage races.

Final USA Cycling NRC standings

Individual standings 
  - 1,355 points
 - 1,326 points
 - 1,226 points
 - 1,149 points
 - 1,008 points

Team standings 
 4,432
 4,114
 2,088
 2,040
 1,232

Racing calendar and results

References 

Cycle races in the United States
 
2007 in American sports